The knockout phase of UEFA Euro 2012 began with the quarter-finals on 21 June 2012, and was completed on 1 July 2012 with the final at the Olympic Stadium in Kyiv, won by Spain 4–0 against Italy. After the completion of the group stage on 19 June 2012, eight teams qualified for the quarter-finals (two from each group), which are to be played from 21 to 24 June 2012. Host nations Poland and Ukraine failed to qualify for the quarter-finals, making it only the third time in European Championship history that the host nation(s) failed to make it out of the group stage; at Euro 2000, co-host Belgium were eliminated at the group stage, and at Euro 2008, co-hosts Austria and Switzerland also failed to qualify for the quarter-finals.

Format
Any game in the knockout stage that was undecided by the end of the regular 90 minutes was followed by 30 minutes of extra time (two 15-minute halves). If scores were still level after 30 minutes of extra time, there would be a penalty shootout (at least five penalties each, and more if necessary) to determine who progressed to the next round. As with every tournament since UEFA Euro 1984, there was no third place play-off.

Qualified teams
The top two placed teams from each of the four groups qualified for the knockout stage.

Bracket

Quarter-finals

Czech Republic vs Portugal

Germany vs Greece

Spain vs France

England vs Italy

Semi-finals

Portugal vs Spain

Germany vs Italy

Final

References

External links
 UEFA Euro 2012 official history

UEFA Euro 2012
2012
Czech Republic at UEFA Euro 2012
Portugal at UEFA Euro 2012
knock
knock
knock
knock
Germany at UEFA Euro 2012
Greece at UEFA Euro 2012